Lively is an English surname. Notable people with the surname include:

Adam Lively (born 1961), British novelist
Ben Lively (born 1992), American baseball player
Blake Lively (born 1987 as Blake Ellender Brown), American actress
Bob Lively (1923–1994), American jazz saxophonist
Buddy Lively (1925–2015), American baseball player
Charles Lively (athlete) (1893–1971), British athlete
Charles Lively (labor spy) (1887–1962), American labor spy
David Lively (born 1953), American classical pianist
Donald Lively, American lawyer
Edward Lively (1545–1605), English linguist and biblical scholar
Eric Lively (born 1981 as Eric Lawrence Brown), American actor
Ernie Lively (1947–2021, born as Ernest Wilson Brown, Jr.), American actor
Gerry Lively, American cinematographer and film director
Jack Lively (1885–1967), American baseball player
Jason Lively (born 1968), American actor
John Lively (politician) (born 1946), American politician
Katherine Allen Lively, American pianist and writer
Lori Lively (born 1966), American actress
Mitch Lively (born 1985), American baseball player
Penelope Lively (born 1933 as Penelope Low), British writer
Pierce Lively (1921–2016), American judge
Robert Lively (screenwriter) (died 1943), American screenwriter and songwriter
Robert M. Lively (1855–1929), American politician
Robyn Lively (born 1972), American actress
Scott Lively (born 1957), American author, attorney and anti-LGBT activist
Shannon Lively (born 1992), Australian actor
Zack Lively (born 1987), American actor

See also
Lively (disambiguation)

English-language surnames

de:Lively